The CONMEBOL South American Beach Soccer League, named natively in Spanish as the CONMEBOL Liga Sudamericana de Fútbol Playa, is a continental league competition for South American men's national beach soccer teams. 

The competition is organized by the governing body for South American football, CONMEBOL, who started the league in 2017 as part of its Development Department's Evolution Program. All ten members of the continental confederation take part in the league, with both senior and under 20s teams representing each nation; therefore, a total of 20 teams participate. 

The league consists of two phases: the regular season and the finals. The teams are first divided into two geographically based conferences, the North zone and South zone, to compete in a round robin tournament against the other members of their own zone during the regular season. The winners of each zone then proceed to face each other in the finals to contest the league title.

Brazil are the current champions.

Competition structure
The league operates under the following format:

Zones & teams 
The ten member nations of CONMEBOL have been split into two conferences based on their geographic location in South America: a North zone and a South zone, comprising five nations each. 
Each nation is represented by two teams: their senior national team and their under 20s national team. Therefore, a total of 20 teams take part.

Regular season 
During the regular season, each zone hosts its own tournament involving all five nations of said zone, taking place in one of the five countries of the zone in question over the course of five days.
The fixtures are split into two categories of matches; a set of matches contested between the senior representative teams and a set of matches contested between the Under 20s teams. 
Teams compete in a round robin format exclusively against the other four teams in their own category. 
Points earned by the nations in both the senior and the under 20s matches are combined into one single cumulative table.
The nation top of the table with the most points after all matches are completed are deemed zone champions; the winning nations of each zone event proceed to the finals.

Finals 
In the finals, the North zone champion faces the South zone champion; their senior teams play each other over two legs, as do their under 20s representatives for a total of four matches.
The event takes place over two days. The first leg of the senior and under 20s ties take place on day one and the second legs, on day two. 
The nation which accumulates the most points from all four matches combined will be crowned league champions.
If the teams are level on points after the four matches are complete, a tie-breaking penalty shootout is contested to decide the winners.

Conferences
The current allocation of the ten member nations of CONMEBOL into the North zone and the South zone is as follows:

The composition of the zones has been the same in the four editions to date, save for 2019.

Notes:

Results
The following shows the results of the finals in which the regular season champions of the respective zones play against each other for the league title. The nation that earns the most points from the four matches that comprise the finals, wins the league.

The league did not take place at all in 2020 or 2021 due to the effects of the COVID-19 pandemic in South America.

Statistics

All-time tables
Key:
Won in normal time W = 3 points / Won in extra-time W+ = 2 points / Won on penalty shoot-out WP = 1 point / Lost L = 0 points / Points per game PPG

As of the 2022 north zone event.

Combined results

Seniors

Under 20s

See also
South American Futsal League

References

External links
CONMEBOL, official website (in Spanish)

 
Beach soccer competitions
CONMEBOL competitions
Recurring sporting events established in 2017